Ungerman is a surname. Notable people with the surname include:

Irving Ungerman (1923–2015), Canadian businessman

See also
Unterman